John Hopere Wharewiti Uru (26 March 1868 –  29 November 1921), sometimes known as Billy Uru, was a New Zealand Māori sportsman and politician. He represented Canterbury at both cricket and rugby union, and was an Independent (and sometimes Reform) Member of Parliament for Southern Maori.

Early life and family
Uru was born at Kaiapoi, the son of farmer Hoani Uru and his wife Kataraina Kaiparoa, probably on 26 March 1868. A member of the Ngāi Tūāhuriri hapū (sub-tribe) of Ngāi Tahu, Uru was educated at Te Aute College from 1889. He married Rahera Muriwai Mutu in 1892; the couple subsequently divorced in 1915 and it is not thought that they had any children. The following year he remarried, to Riwaka Anaha Tauwhare, and subsequently had two children.

A captain in the North Canterbury Mounted Rifle Volunteers, Uru was sergeant of the Māori contingent at the diamond jubilee of Queen Victoria in London in 1897, commander of the Māori contingent at the opening of Australia's federal parliament in 1901, and second-in-command of the New Zealand contingent at the coronation of Edward VII.

Sporting career
A fast bowler, Uru played two first-class games for the Canterbury cricket team, one in each of the 1893–94 and 1894-95 seasons. He took nine wickets at an average of 11.33, and achieved best bowling figures of 5 for 43.

Uru also represented Canterbury at rugby union as a three-quarter in 1896, and was noted as a fine kicker. He was a member of the Kaiapoi Football Club, which later became the Tuahiwi Club, of which he was captain.

He was also noted as a wrestler, hammer thrower and caber tosser.

Political career

Uru unsuccessfully stood for Parliament in the Southern Maori electorate against Tame Parata at the 1905, 1908 and 1911 general elections. Finally, in the 1918 by-election precipitated by the death of sitting member Taare Parata, Uru was elected to Parliament, defeating Parata's brother Henare Parata, with a majority of 19 votes (242 votes to 223). Uru was an independent member, but tended to align himself with the Reform Party. He  was re-elected at the 1919 general election and held the seat until his death from Bright's disease in Wellington on 29 November 1921. His body was returned to Tuahiwi Pā, near Kaiapoi, for lying in state before burial.

He was active in Ngāi Tahu's political and legal fight for resources and land. In 1907 he was elected secretary of Te Kerēme o Ngāi Tahu rāua ko Ngāti Māmoe, the Ngāi Tahu committee charged with pursuing the tribe's claim. While in Parliament, he was successful in seeking the establishment of a commission to investigate the Kemp Purchase (the purchase in 1848 of 20 million acres of land in Canterbury for £2,000).

References

1868 births
1921 deaths
Ngāi Tahu people
Independent MPs of New Zealand
Reform Party (New Zealand) MPs
New Zealand MPs for Māori electorates
Members of the New Zealand House of Representatives
Unsuccessful candidates in the 1911 New Zealand general election
Unsuccessful candidates in the 1908 New Zealand general election
Unsuccessful candidates in the 1905 New Zealand general election
New Zealand rugby union players
Canterbury rugby union players
Rugby union three-quarters
New Zealand cricketers
Canterbury cricketers
New Zealand male hammer throwers
New Zealand male sport wrestlers
Deaths from nephritis
People educated at Te Aute College